Dornakal Diocese is a diocese of the Church of South India in Telangana state of India. It is among 22 dioceses of the Church of South India.The diocese mainly covers the pastorates in Warangal, Nalgonda, East Godavari and Khammam districts and also has churches in Odissha state.

History

The Diocese of Dornakal
was formed in December 1912. Vedanayagam Samuel Azariah was consecrated as its first bishop in St. Paul's Cathedral, Calcutta. He was the first Indian Anglican Bishop of Dornakal and was a leader in the Christian evangelistic movement in South Asia during the early twentieth century. Azariah was the first Indian to be consecrated a bishop in the Anglican Communion.

When the Diocese was first formed, it was a small district in the southeast corner of the Nizam's dominions. A few years later, it was enlarged by the addition of the Dummugudem district, in which the Church Missionary Society (CMS) was working. Through this, all of the districts of both the CMS and the Society for the Propagation of the Gospel (SPG) in the Telugu country were placed under the jurisdiction of the Bishop of Dornakal.

The present Diocese of Dornakal includes a large portion of the Krishna district, together with the part of the Godavari districts, parts of the Kurnool and Kadapa districts to the south occupied by the SPG, the areas in the Hyderabad State occupied by the Indian Missionary Society of Tinnevelly (IMST), the Singareni Mission, the Khammamett Mission, and the recently formed Dornakal Diocesan Mission, which has started work in the Mulag Taluq.

Funding
The former president bishop of the church Rt. Rev. Dr Vadapalli Prasada Rao stated that the church is run entirely on Indian funds, which he says helps ensure the churches continued independence from the "Anglican Communion".

Bishops
Vedanayagam Samuel Azariah (1912–45)
 A. B. Elliott (1945-1955)
 Yeddu Muthyalu, assistant bishop (1945–1947; became first Bishop in Krishna-Godavari)
 P. Solomon (1956-1979)
 G. S. Luke (1980-1985)
 D. N. Samuel (1986-1996) 
 A. Rajarathnam (1997-2006)
 B. S. Devamani (2006-2012)
 V. Prasada Rao (2012-7.9.2020)
K. Padma Rao (20.06.2021-Present)

Group church councils and chairman
Rev. Dr. K. N. Bhushanam, Kothagudem GCC
Rev. K. Padma Rao, Sagar GCC
Rev. Irri John Wesley, Kodad GCC
Rev. B. Ravindra, Khammam GCC
Rev. G. Ramesh, Sathupalli GCC
Rev. I. H. R. Paul Mohan Rao, Dummagudem GCC
Rev. P. Sunil, Dornakal GCC

Churches
CSI Epiphany Cathedral Church, Dornakal
St. Andrew's Church, Kothagudem
St. Mary's Church, Khammam
St. Paul's Church, Aswapuram
St. Paul's Church, P.V. Colony
Christ Church, Bhadrachalam
St. Peter's Church Kodad
St. Paul's Church, Mahabubabad
St. Paul's Church, Palvancha
St. Timothy Church, Huzurnagar
St. John's Church, Yellandu
St. John's Church, J.K colony, Yellandu
St. Philip's Church, Nava bharat
Christ Church, Indira Nagar, KMM
St. Mark's Church, NSP, Khammam
St. Luke Church, Singabhupalem, KTDM
St. Thomas Church, Ramavaram, KTDM
St. James Church, Gouthampur
St Peter's Church, Rudrampur
Christ Church, Parsibandam, khammam
St. John's Church v.m.banjara,
St. Peter's church, Madiripuram, Near Bangla
Church Of South India, Miryalaguda, Dornakal Diocese
 St. Andrew's Church,Anisettipally Malapally

Educational institutions 
Bishop Azariah High School for Girls, Dornakal
Bishop Azariah Junior college for Girls, Dornakal
Dornakal Diocese. Degree College, Dornakal
Dornakal Diocese. Junior College, Dornakal
Dornakal Diocese. High School, Dornakal
St. Mary's High school, Khammam
St. Andrew's High School, Kothagudem
St. Christ Church Primary School, Bhadrachalam
St. Peter's Primary School, Thoorubaka, Bhadrachalam
Dorkal Diocese Hostel, Chadrupatla
 Mission High school  (Aided), Madiripuram

Further reading

References 

Anglican dioceses in Asia
Dornakal
Christianity in Telangana
Christian organizations established in 1912
1912 establishments in India
Church of India, Burma and Ceylon